Darren Cahill and Mark Kratzmann were the defending champions but they competed with different partners that year, Cahill with John Fitzgerald and Kratzmann with Broderick Dyke.

Dyke and Kratzmann lost in the first round to Peter Doohan and Laurie Warder.

Cahill and Fitzgerald won in the final 6–3, 6–2 against Martin Davis and Brad Drewett.

Seeds

  Darren Cahill /  John Fitzgerald (champions)
  Martin Davis /  Brad Drewett (final)
  Grant Connell /  Glenn Michibata (quarterfinals)
  Peter Doohan /  Laurie Warder (quarterfinals)

Draw

External links
1988 Swan Premium Open Doubles Draw

Doubles